WRNC-LP was a student-owned, freeform radio station on 97.7 MHz, and served the Chequamegon Bay area from the campus of Northland College in Ashland, Wisconsin.

WRNC began in 1995 as a student initiative initially began broadcasting in 1998 at 25 milliwatts. Soon after the station began broadcasting, student organizers discovered that licensing paperwork had never been filed with the Federal Communications Commission (FCC), which led to an end of broadcasting for the new station.

In 2001, an LPFM tower construction permit was drafted and filed with the FCC. In 2003, Northland College was granted a 100-watt, low-power frequency to begin broadcasting in December of that year.

WRNC-LP, in its latest incarnation, began broadcasting in May 2005. The station featured a variety of programming and operated twenty-four hours a day.

The station also webcast its programming via its website.

WRNC-LP ceased operations on or about May 23, 2017. The closure of the radio station was due to budget cutbacks, at a time when the college was attempting to find solutions to a severe budget shortfall. Its license expired December 1, 2020.

References

External links
WRNC myspace
 

RNC-LP
Freeform radio stations
RNC-LP
RNC-LP
Northland College (Wisconsin)
Defunct radio stations in the United States
2005 establishments in Wisconsin
2020 disestablishments in Wisconsin
Radio stations established in 2005
Radio stations disestablished in 2020
RNC-LP